Ronald Welch (14 December 1909 – 5 February 1982) was the pseudonym of Welsh writer Ronald Oliver Felton TD, who wrote in English. He is best known for children's historical fiction. He won the 1956 Carnegie Medal from the Library Association for the year's best children's book by a British author, for Knight Crusader, the first in his so-called Carey Family series of novels.

Life
He was born in Aberavon, West Glamorgan. He was teaching at Bedford Modern School when the Second World War broke out. In 1940 he was commissioned lieutenant in the Welch Regiment, to which his pen name refers. He reached the rank of major and stayed in the Territorial Army after the war. He was for many years headmaster of Okehampton Grammar School in Devon.

Welch's final work, The Road to Waterloo, not strictly speaking part of the Carey family saga but closely connected to it in terms of subject matter, remained unpublished at the time of his death. It was not until 2018 that it was discovered among his papers and published in a special edition by Smith Settle.

Carey family saga

Notes
The Carey family home is at Llansteffan Castle (or Llanstephan), Carmarthenshire, Wales. The house may be based on Plas Llanstephan.
The home of the junior branch of the Carey family (descended from Rupert Carey) is at Horton Hall, on the Gower.
The Carey family has a long-standing connection with the d'Assailly family of France. Neil and Richard Carey (and probably others) married a d'Assailly. The head of the family is the Marquis de Vernaye and the family home is near Graye-sur-Mer (see Escape From France).
The heir to the Earl (usually his eldest son) has the title Viscount Cilfrew (Cilfrew is a village near Neath, Glamorgan). Holders of the title mentioned include Denzil and Bernard Carey.
The books do not indicate a connection to the Scottish Duke of Aubigny.
The Carey coat-of-arms is a black hawk on a yellow background (see Bowman of Crecy, For the King).
Nicholas Carey/Ensign Carey and The Hawk/The Galleon are the only books that cover the same periods of time.
The books contain explicit dates and historical events so the time period covered is usually easy to calculate

Books

Family members

Military service

Works

Books
The Black Car Mystery (1950)
The Clock Stood Still (1951)
The Gauntlet (1951)
Knight Crusader † (1954) —winner of the Carnegie Medal
Sker House (novel) (1955) (writing as Ronald Felton) (based on Sker House)
Ferdinand Magellan (1955)
Captain of Dragoons † (1956)
"The Long Bow" (1957, booklet consisting of the abridged first three chapters of Bowman of Crécy)
Mohawk Valley † (1958)
Captain of Foot † (1959)
Escape from France † (1960)
For the King † (1961)
Nicholas Carey † (1963)
Bowman of Crécy † (1966)
The Hawk † (1967)
Sun of York (1970)
The Galleon † (1971)
Tank Commander † (1972)
Zulu Warrior  (1974)
Ensign Carey † (1976)
The Road to Waterloo † (2018) (posthumous)

† indicates a book in the Carey family series

Short stories

 "The Kings Hunt" (1963), Swift Annual 1963
 "The Joust" (1968), Miscellany Five, edited by Edward Blishen
 "The King's Hunt" (1970), Thrilling Stories of the Past for Boys, edited by Eric Duthie

See also

Notes

References

Welsh military personnel
British children's writers
British historical novelists
Welsh schoolteachers
Carnegie Medal in Literature winners
Welch Regiment officers
Officers' Training Corps officers
British Army personnel of World War II
1909 births
1982 deaths
Place of death missing
20th-century British novelists
Schoolteachers from Devon
Writers of historical fiction set in the Middle Ages
Writers of historical fiction set in the early modern period
Writers of historical fiction set in the modern age